Pseudopelastoneurus is a genus of flies in the family Dolichopodidae. It includes two African species that were formerly classified in the genus Pelastoneurus.

Species
Pseudopelastoneurus diversifemur (Parent, 1935) – Angola, Cameroon, Central African Republic, DR Congo, Equatorial Guinea (Fernando Poo), Gabon, Ghana, Ivory Coast, Kenya, Sierra Leone, Uganda
Pseudopelastoneurus diversipes (Parent, 1934) – Sierra Leone, Cameroon

References

Dolichopodinae
Dolichopodidae genera
Diptera of Africa